Peter Glen Prescott is a musician from Boston, Massachusetts.

He is best known as the drummer for Mission of Burma. After Burma disbanded in 1983, Prescott remained active in the Boston music scene, forming Volcano Suns and later Kustomized, Peer Group, and Minibeast. Since Burma's reformation, beginning with 2004's ONoffON, Prescott has resumed his original duties alongside bandmates Roger Miller and Clint Conley.

References

External links
 Peter Prescott at Discogs

20th-century American drummers
Living people
Male drummers
Mission of Burma members
Musicians from Boston
Year of birth missing (living people)
American post-punk musicians